Toshi Reagon (born January 27, 1964) is an American musician of folk, blues, gospel, rock and funk, as well as a composer, curator, and producer.

Early life
Born January 27, 1964 in Atlanta, Georgia, Reagon grew up in Washington, D.C. She was raised by musician parents active in the civil rights movement. Her mother, Bernice Johnson Reagon, founded the all-woman a cappella group Sweet Honey in the Rock in 1973, which had a profound influence on her. Her father, Cordell Hull Reagon, was a leader of the civil rights movement in Albany (Georgia) and member of the Student Nonviolent Coordinating Committee (SNCC). Her parents were also part of the civil rights musical group The Freedom Singers.

Reagon lists 1970's rock & roll bands such as Led Zeppelin, Black Sabbath, and Kiss, as well as classic Blues musicians such as Big Mama Thornton, Howlin' Wolf, and Big Bill Broonzy as additional musical influences.

Career

Bands and performances 
Reagon began performing at age 17 when Lenny Kravitz invited her to open for him on his first world tour. She has since shared the stage with performers including Ani DiFranco, Elvis Costello and Meshell Ndegeocello.

Reagon's first album, Justice, was released in 1990 through Flying Fish Records. Since then, she has released many solo albums, including her most recent SpiritLand in December 2018.

Her band, BIGLovely, has been performing since September 1996. The name BIGLovely comes from a term Reagon's girlfriend used to address her in a letter. The band includes Judith Casselberry on acoustic guitar and vocals, Robert "Chicken" Burke on drums, Fred Cass, Jr. on bass, Adam Widoff on electric guitar, and Catherine Russell on mandolin and vocals. The line-up also includes Jen Leigh, Ann Klein, Debbie Robinson, Allison Miller, Kismet Lyles and Stephanie McKay as substitutes.

Parable of the Sower Opera 
Reagon's Parable of the Sower rock-opera, based on the novel by Octavia Butler, had its world premiere at NYU Abu Dhabi Arts Center in fall 2017. Shortly after, the US premiere was performed at Carolina Performing Arts at UNC-Chapel Hill, where Reagon was also an artist in residence. On April 26, 2019, it was performed at the O'Shaughnessy Auditorium in Saint Paul, Minnesota. The performance, created and written by Toshi Reagon and Bernice Reagon, and directed by Eric Ting, included over 20 singers, actors, and musicians. Reagon has been a big fan of Octavia Butler's works and her themes of Afrofuturism and the eerily similar political climates led Reagon to create the opera. In relation to the differences between the novel and the opera, Reagon notes: "We had to make the opera different because the book is enormous. We wanted to focus on the idea of two communities: one that you are born into and that holds you. The second is an unknown community that you find and who finds you. We thought it should start with this known intimate community and then tell the story by bringing the entire theater and audience into that community. That is why the lights are up at the start of the performance. We wanted audiences to experience a comfortable space and then have the experience of watching things get uncomfortable. We decided to show how fragile we become when we hold on to something when it's time to change."

Reagon's "congregational opera" was first performed in 2015 at both the Public Theater’s Under the Radar Festival and at The Arts Center at NYU Abu Dhabi (NYUAD) in 2017.

Discography

Studio and live albums
 1990 Justice, Flying Fish Records
 1994 The Rejected Stone, PRO-MAMMA LP's
 1997 Kindness, Smithsonian Folkways
 1999 The Righteous Ones, Razor and Tie
 2001 Africans in America Soundtrack w/Bernice Johnson Reagon, Various artists. Ryco
 2002 TOSHI, Razor and Tie
 2004 I Be Your Water, limited self-release
 2005 Have You Heard, Righteous Babe Records
 2008 Until We’re Done, self-release
 2009 Lava: We Become, self-release
 2010 There and Back Again, self-release
 2018 SpirtLand, self release

Compilation albums
 Shout Sister Shout, a tribute to Sister Rosetta Tharpe and Respond II
 Dreaming Wide Awake, Lizz Wright with Toshi Reagon: Vocals
 Real Music, Chocolate Genius with Toshi Reagon: Vocals
 Raise Your Voice,  Sweet Honey In The Rock collaboration with Toshi Reagon and BIGLovely 
 Africans In America, Rycodisc, Toshi Reagon: Musician, Composer and Associate Producer
 The Temptation of Saint Anthony
 Every Mother Counts Starbucks

Producer
 The Temptation of Saint Anthony Studio Cast Recording, Songtalk Music, 2006
 Sweet Honey in the Rock: The Women Gather, 30th Anniversary, Earthbeat Records, 2003
 Sweet Honey in the Rock: Sacred Ground, Earthbeat Records, 1995. Co-produced with Bernice Johnson Reagon
 Sweet Honey in the Rock: In This Land, Earthbeat Records, 1992. Co-produced with Bernice Johnson Reagon

She also appeared on the TV show The L Word in the last episode of the fourth season, where she sings a song on the beach at Tasha's party.

Awards and recognition
2021 Religion and the Arts Award by the American Academy of Religion
2021 The Herb Alpert Award in the Arts
2021 The APAP Award of Merit for Achievement in the Performing Arts
2015 Ford Foundation Art of Change Fellow
2009 Out Music Award
2007 Black Lily Award for Outstanding Performance
2004 New York Foundation for the Arts award for music composition

Personal life
Reagon is the goddaughter of folk singer Pete Seeger and is named after his wife, Toshi Seeger.

Reagon, a lesbian, lives in Brooklyn, New York with her partner and their adopted daughter.

References

External links
 Official website
 
 
 Discography at Smithsonian Folkways
 Toshi Reagon's bandcamp

1964 births
American folk singers
Songwriters from Georgia (U.S. state)
Feminist musicians
American lesbian musicians
LGBT African Americans
Living people
Righteous Babe Records artists
Guitarists from Georgia (U.S. state)
LGBT people from Georgia (U.S. state)
20th-century American guitarists
20th-century American women guitarists
African-American women songwriters
African-American guitarists
20th-century American LGBT people
21st-century American LGBT people
20th-century African-American women singers
21st-century African-American women singers
African American female guitarists